Vahe sometimes Vahé is a given name in Armenian (in Armenian Վահե in Western Armenian Վահէ).

Notable people with the name include:

Vahe (351 BC – 331 BC), also known as Vahe Haykazuni, legendary king of Armenia. He was the last offspring of the Haik Dynasty.
Vahe Aghabegians (born 1952), Armenian technology expert
Vahe Enfiajyan (born 1978), Armenian politician and MP 
Vahe Gurzadyan (born 1955), Armenian mathematical physicist and professor 
Vahe Hakobyan (born 1977), Armenian politician and MP
Vahé Katcha (1928-2003), French Armenian writer, screenwriter and journalist
Vahé Oshagan (1922–2000), Armenian poet, writer, literary critic
Vahe Stepanyan (born 1948), Armenian jurist
Vahe Tadevosyan (born 1983), Armenian football player 
Vahe Tilbian (born 1980), Armenian-Ethiopian singer and part of the musical group Genealogy

See also
Vahevuni, a region in Armenia, home of the ruling Vahevuni family in old Armenia c. 400–800

Armenian masculine given names